Big Father, Small Father and Other Stories is a 2015 Vietnamese drama film directed by .

It was screened in the main competition section of the 65th Berlin International Film Festival in 2015.

Cast
 Lê Công Hoàng as Vu
 Đỗ Thị Hải Yến as Van
  as Thang

References

External links
 Official Site
 
 Facebook
 Vancouver International Film Festival (programme note)
 Hong Kong International Filml Festival (programme note)

2015 films
2015 drama films
2015 LGBT-related films
Vietnamese-language films
Vietnamese LGBT-related films
LGBT-related drama films
Vietnamese drama films